Aliannis Urgellés Montoya (born 25 June 1985) is a Cuban football defender.

Club career
Urgellés played for his provincial team Guantánamo in Cuba before moving to Germany. He was the Cuban league's top goalscorer in 2011.

In 2016 he left SW Neukölln for Croatia Berlin.

International career
He made his international debut for Cuba in a February 2008 friendly match against Guyana and has earned a total of 44 caps, scoring 2 goals. He represented his country in 7 FIFA World Cup qualification matches and appeared in three matches with the Cuba national football team for the 2011 CONCACAF Gold Cup.

His final international was a July 2013 CONCACAF Gold Cup match against Panama.

References

External links
 

1985 births
Living people
Cuban footballers
Cuba international footballers
Association football fullbacks
FC Guantánamo players
2011 CONCACAF Gold Cup players
2013 CONCACAF Gold Cup players
Cuban expatriate footballers
Expatriate footballers in Germany
Cuban expatriate sportspeople in Germany
People from Guantánamo Province